In numerical analysis, mortar methods are discretization methods for partial differential equations, which use separate finite element discretization on nonoverlapping subdomains. The meshes on the subdomains do not match on the interface, and the equality of the solution is enforced by Lagrange multipliers, judiciously chosen to preserve the accuracy of the solution. Mortar discretizations lend themselves naturally to the solution by iterative domain decomposition methods such as FETI and balancing domain decomposition In the engineering practice in the finite element method, continuity of solutions between non-matching subdomains is implemented by multiple-point constraints.

References

Domain decomposition methods